Franca Peggion (born 14 January 1934) is a former Italian pentathlete.

Career
She competed in the women's 100 metres at the 1956 Summer Olympics.

References

External links
 

1934 births
Living people
Athletes (track and field) at the 1956 Summer Olympics
Italian female sprinters
Italian female pentathletes
Olympic athletes of Italy
Olympic female sprinters
20th-century Italian women